Darius Dickson Ishaku  (born 30 July 1954) is a Nigerian architect, urban planner, university lecturer and politician. He is a member of the Peoples Democratic Party and the Governor of Taraba State since May 2015.

Early life

Ishaku was born on 30 July 1954 to Mr Ishaku Istifanus and Mrs Naomi at Lupwe in Ussa Local Government Area of Taraba State. He is the fifth of ten children from his family.

The young Darius was enrolled into St Bartholomew's Primary school, Wusasa, Zaria, in 1961, and graduated in 1967.

He then proceeded to famous St. Paul's College Kufena, Zaria, for his secondary education, in 1972 and passed out in flying colours, obtaining West African Examination Certificate (WASC). He secured admission into the school of basic studies in prestigious Ahmadu Bello University, Zaria, in the same year (1972), for his advance Level education which was then a requirement for gaining admission into the university, and he passed out in 1974.. He proceeded to the Ahmadu Bello University (ABU) where he studied and obtained a Bachelor's and a master's degree in Architecture, he went further to obtain an additional master's degree in Urban and regional planning.

Darius is a fellow of the Nigerian Institute of Architects (FNIA) and also a fellow of the Nigerian Institute of Town Planners (FNITP).

Political career
Ishaku was previously the supervising minister for power, supervising minister for environment and the Minister of State for Niger Delta Affairs before he resigned to contest in the 2015 Taraba State gubernatorial election. He won the initial gubernatorial election against Aisha Jumai Alhassan of APC and David Sabo Kente of SDP, and was elected Governor of Taraba State after winning the subsequent re-run election. Darius won the 2015 election but was in a court battle with his opponent senator Aisha Jumai Alhassan who took him to court and after a series of cases Darius was declared the winner of the governorship election in the state early 2016.

Darius Ishaku was again successful, for his second run, in the gubernatorial election of March 2019, defeating his closest rival Alhaji Abubakar Sani Danladi of the All Progressives Congress by over 150,000 votes.

See also
 List of Nigerian architects
List of Governors of Taraba State

Award 
In October 2022, a Nigerian national honour of Commander Of The Order Of The Niger (CON) was conferred on him by President Muhammadu Buhari.

References

1954 births
Living people
People from Taraba State 
Peoples Democratic Party state governors of Nigeria
Governors of Taraba State
Nigerian architects
Taraba State Peoples Democratic Party politicians
Ahmadu Bello University alumni